Botnărești is a commune in the Anenii Noi District of the Republic of Moldova. It is composed of two villages, Botnărești and Salcia.

References

Communes of Anenii Noi District